Clayton Railroad Station is a historic railway station located at Clayton, Kent County, Delaware. It was built about 1855, and is a one-story, five bay, brick, Italianate-style building.  It as a low hip roof which extends about three feet from the building forming an overhang.  It was built by the Delaware Railroad and remained in use as a passenger service into the 1950s.  It later housed an antique shop.

It was added to the National Register of Historic Places in 1986.

References

External links

Railway stations on the National Register of Historic Places in Delaware
Italianate architecture in Delaware
Railway stations in the United States opened in 1855
Transportation buildings and structures in Kent County, Delaware
National Register of Historic Places in Kent County, Delaware
Former Pennsylvania Railroad stations
Former railway stations in Delaware